Tom Herman (born 1975) is head football coach at Florida Atlantic.

Thomas or Tom Herman may also refer to:
R. Thomas Herman, columnist for The Wall Street Journal
Tom Herman (American football coach, Mercyhurst), American football offensive line coach at Mercyhurst University
Tom Herman, member of Pere Ubu

See also
Thomas Herman Johnson (1870–1927), Canadian politician